Lambin is a surname. Notable people with the surname include:

Chase Lambin (born 1979), American baseball player and coach
Daniela Mona Lambin (born 1991), Estonian footballer
Denis Lambin (1520–1572), French classical scholar
Suzanne Lambin (1902–2008), French microbiologist